The Order may refer to:

Comics
 The Order (comics), the name of two fictional comic-book superhero teams in the Marvel Comics universe

Computer and video games
 The Order: 1886, a video game
 The Order, a fictional terrorist faction in the video game Freelancer (2003)
 The Order (Deus Ex), a fictional pseudo-religious organization in the computer game Deus Ex: Invisible War (2003)
 The Order, a fictional religious group in the video-game franchise Silent Hill (1999, first in series)

Film and television
 The Order (2001 film), a 2001 film directed by Sheldon Lettich; written by and starring Jean-Claude Van Damme
 The Order (2003 film) (also known as The Sin Eater), a 2003 film written and directed by Brian Helgeland; starring Heath Ledger
 The Order (TV series), an American horror-drama web television series from Netflix

Organizations
 Davis County Cooperative Society, as the Kingston clan calls itself, "The Order", a Mormon organization 
 Kappa Alpha Order, a fraternity also known as "the Order".
 The Order (white supremacist group), a white-nationalist organization active in the United States between 1983 and 1984.

See also
 Order (disambiguation)